Body and Soul is a live album by American saxophonist Dexter Gordon recorded at the Jazzhus Montmartre in Copenhagen, Denmark in 1967.

The album had first been released on the Black Lion label in 1974 as Blues Walk! The Montmatre Collection Vol. II with only four tracks (i.e. without "Come Rain or Come Shine").

Critical reception 

AllMusic critic Michael G. Nastos stated "This set is recommended along with the two other CDs from this well-documented engagement".

Track listing 
 "Like Someone in Love"  (Jimmy Van Heusen, Johnny Burke) – 12:38
 "Come Rain or Come Shine" (Harold Arlen, Johnny Mercer) – 11:04
 "There Will Never Be Another You" (Harry Warren, Mack Gordon) – 12:29
 "Body and Soul" (Johnny Green, Frank Eyton, Edward Heyman, Robert Sour) – 9:34
 "Blues Walk" (Lou Donaldson) – 13:25

Personnel 
Dexter Gordon – tenor saxophone
Kenny Drew – piano
Niels-Henning Ørsted Pedersen – bass
Albert Heath – drums

References 

Black Lion Records live albums
Dexter Gordon live albums
1981 live albums
Albums recorded at Jazzhus Montmartre